Rama Devi Women's University, formerly known as Rama Devi Women's Autonomous College, is a state university for women in Bhubaneswar, Odisha, India. Named after freedom fighter and social reformer Ramadevi Choudhury.

History
The institution started as Government Women's College in 1964 in a small building of the Labour Department of Govt. of Orissa and was affiliated to Utkal University at that time.

The college was later shifted to the Old School Building of Unit-1, Bhubaneswar in 1966 and ultimately to the present campus near Rupali Square of Bhubaneswar (present University campus) on 1 January 1969.

The name of the college was changed to Rama Devi Women's College in 1969 and was given Autonomous status on 19 June 1999.

Higher Secondary wing of Rama Devi Women's Autonomous College was separated from the Autonomous College from 2001.

The college was accredited by NAAC with grade 'A' on 16 September 2004. It was reaccredited with an 'A' grade again in February 2015. In 2010, it was given CPE (College with Potential for Excellence) Status by UGC.

On its Golden Jubilee celebration, former President of India Pranab Mukherjee attended as the Chief Guest in its Inaugural function on 30th Nov 2014.

Under the RUSA scheme the college was upgraded to the Status of a Women's University on 30 May 2015. As an affiliating University, 46 Women's Colleges under Utkal University came under the jurisdiction of the new university. The Chief Minister of Odisha officially inaugurated the university in a ceremony held on 3 December 2015 coinciding with the birth day of Maa Rama Devi.

On July 1, 2021, the university was accorded with 12(B) status by UGC.

Academics
The university has respective departments under its seven schools. It offers various undergraduate, postgraduate and Ph.D courses.

School of Biotechnology
Department of Biotechnology
School of Life Sciences
Department of Life Science
Department of Botany
Department of Zoology
School of Physical & Mathematical Sciences
Department of Physics
Department of Chemistry
Department of Computer Science
Department of Mathematics
Department of Statistics
School of Commerce, Management & Communication
Department of Commerce
Department of Business Administrative
Department of Journalism & Mass Communication
School of Pedagogical Science
Department of Education
School of Languages Literature & Culture
Department of English
Department of Odia
Department of Sanskrit
Department of Hindi
Department of Music
School of Social Sciences & Humanities
Department of Gender Studies
Department of Economics
Department of Home Science
Department of History
Department of Philosophy
Department of Sociology
Department of Political Science
Department of Psychology
Department of NCC

Notable alumni 

 Droupadi Murmu, 15th President of India.
 Valena Valentina, Indian karateka
 Anu Choudhury, actress

See also
 Department of Higher Education (Odisha)

References

External links
 

Women's universities and colleges in Odisha
Universities in Bhubaneswar
2015 establishments in Odisha
Educational institutions established in 2015